South Tucson is a city in Pima County, Arizona, United States and an enclave of the much larger city of Tucson. South Tucson is known for being heavily influenced by Hispanic, and especially Mexican, culture; restaurants and shops which sell traditional Mexican food and other goods can be found throughout the city. According to the 2010 census, the population of the city is 5,652.

Geography
South Tucson is located at  (32.196076, -110.968896). The city is an enclave entirely surrounded by the much larger city of Tucson.

Demographics

As of the census of 2000, there were 5,490 people, 1,810 households, and 1,125 families residing in the city. The racial makeup of the city was 43.46% White, 2.31% Black or African American, 9.14% Native American, 0.40% Asian, 0.05% Pacific Islander, 41.24% from other races, and 3.39% from two or more races. 81.24% of the population were Hispanic or Latino of any race.

There were 1,810 households, out of which 33.3% had children under the age of 18 living with them, 34.9% were married couples living together, 20.5% had a female householder with no husband present, and 37.8% were non-families. 31.9% of all households were made up of individuals, and 11.2% had someone living alone who was 65 years of age or older. The average household size was 2.94 and the average family size was 3.83.

In the city, the population was spread out, with 31.5% under the age of 18, 10.1% from 18 to 24, 27.3% from 25 to 44, 21.1% from 45 to 64, and 10.0% who were 65 years of age or older. The median age was 31 years. For every 100 females, there were 112.7 males. For every 100 females age 18 and over, there were 114.4 males.

The median income for a household in the city was $14,587, and the median income for a family was $17,614. Males had a median income of $20,504 versus $14,575 for females. The per capita income for the city was $8,920. About 43.5% of families and 46.5% of the population were below the  poverty line, including 61.2% of those under age 18 and 36.0% of those age 65 or over.

History

In 1936, Tucson officials took steps to expand Tucson's boundaries by moving to annex the unincorporated area along south Sixth Avenue from 25th Street south to the Veterans Hospital, which was south of Tucson city limits. Area auto court and other property owners on south Sixth Avenue objected, as they did not want to pay the higher business taxes imposed by Tucson or be subject to Tucson's building codes. As a recourse to prevent the annexation, south Sixth Avenue property owners submitted a petition to the Pima County Board of Supervisors asking for an incorporation election. On August 10, 1936, South Tucson residents voted 52 to 35 in favor of incorporation. In response, Tucson continued to require Tucson Water customers in South Tucson to obtain building permits from Tucson, or their water would be shut off. The South Tucson City Council responded by imposing a $500 annual franchise fee on Tucson Water, and the Tucson City Council retaliated by announcing that water service would be discontinued to South Tucson within 120 days. On January 18, 1938, 258 petition signatures from South Tucson residents were turned in to the Pima County Board of Supervisors, which dissolved South Tucson. Nonetheless, another incorporation drive was launched in South Tucson. On March 27, 1939, a second incorporation election was held and by a vote of 70 to 63, South Tucson was reincorporated.

In 1956, Tucson Mayor Hummel called for South Tucson to join Tucson. After that invitation went unanswered, the Tucson City Council held a surprise meeting and annexed land all around South Tucson. Later, in the 1990s, Tucson agreed to transfer to South Tucson a 25-acre slice of land between South Tucson and Interstate 10 as South Tucson reached its current city size.

Culture
South Tucson has many Mexican restaurants, colorful buildings and outdoor murals. The existing Mexican food restaurants on South Fourth Avenue have long been a draw.  Some of the long-established eateries dotting South Fourth Avenue in South Tucson have grabbed national headlines, perhaps none more famously than Mi Nidito, where President Bill Clinton had lunch in 1999 and where "the President's Plate" is still on the menu.

The 1.2-square-mile city is gaining favor with businesses and residents and is attracting bohemians, artists, and musicians. The city is trying to attract more business through a new economic development plan and an incentive program. Local business owners and developers are eyeing properties in South Tucson as complementary projects to downtown Tucson with business parks, restaurants, retail shops, and multifamily investors moving into the city.

Crime
South Tucson has also been fighting a long, uphill battle with crime rates. For larceny, theft and aggravated assault, South Tucson ranks at about four times the national average.

However, there have been sizable advances in repressing criminal activity, due to use of "wolf pack" saturation tactics by the South Tucson Police Department in conjunction with the Arizona Department of Public Safety. Vigorous enforcement of liquor license laws has reduced the number of alcohol-related crimes. Neighborhood activism has considerably reduced the amount of open drug activity and a rising level of education of youth is making a slow impact on gang related activity.

Education
South Tucson residents attend Ochoa Community Magnet, Mission View Elementary, Holladay Magnet Elementary, Elizabeth Borton Magnet, Madge Utterback Magnet Middle, Safford K-8 Magnet Baccalaureate World, Tucson High Magnet, & Pueblo Magnet High Schools, all part of Tucson Unified School District.

Governmental representation
South Tucson is in Arizona's 3rd congressional district, represented by Representative Raúl Grijalva, a Democrat.  The city is also in Arizona's 2nd State Legislative District, represented by Representatives Daniel Hernández Jr. and Rosanna Gabaldón and Senator Andrea Dalessandro, all Democrats.

References

External links
 Official website

Cities in Pima County, Arizona
Cities in Arizona
Arizona placenames of Native American origin
Mexican-American culture in Arizona
Populated places in the Sonoran Desert
Enclaves in the United States